Krypton is an American television series developed by David S. Goyer for Syfy. Focusing on Seg-El (Cameron Cuffe), the grandfather of DC Comics superhero Kal-El / Superman, the series is set approximately 200 years before the birth of Superman and takes place on the eponymous fictional planet. Krypton premiered on March 21, 2018. Its first season consists of ten episodes. The second season of ten episodes premiered on June 12, 2019. After its broadcast, Syfy canceled the series after two seasons in August.

Premise
Krypton follows Superman's grandfather, Seg-El, whose family, the House of El, has been ostracized and shamed. Seg  fights to redeem his family's honor and save his beloved world from chaos.

Cast and characters

Main
 Cameron Cuffe as Seg-El: Scion of the House of El, father of Jor-El and the future grandfather of Kal-El, who will become the iconic superhero Superman.
 Nicholas Witham-Mueller as Young Seg-El.
 Georgina Campbell as Lyta-Zod: The Primus in the Kryptonian military guild who was previously in a clandestine relationship with Seg-El.
 Shaun Sipos as Adam Strange: A human from the future who forewarns Seg-El of Brainiac, and tells him of his yet-to-be born grandson Kal-El/Clark Kent.
 Elliot Cowan as Daron-Vex: The former chief magistrate of Kandor, charged with defending Krypton's oligarchy.
 Ann Ogbomo as Jayna-Zod: The former Primus of the Kryptonian military guild, and mother of Lyta. Asiatu Koroma portrays young Jayna.
 Aaron Pierre as Dev-Em: A former commander in the Kryptonian army, and Lyta's ex-betrothed.
 Rasmus Hardiker as Kem: A former bar owner and Seg's best friend.
 Wallis Day as Nyssa-Vex: The former junior magistrate and the daughter of Daron-Vex. She and Seg have a son, Cor-Vex, whom they rename Jor-El.
 Blake Ritson as Brainiac: An alien android being from the planet Colu who collects cities from planets. Brainiac takes over the mind of Krypton's religious figure the Voice of Rao.
 Ian McElhinney as Val-El: Seg's grandfather, who defied death by going to the Phantom Zone and is a staunch believer in space exploration.
 Colin Salmon as General Dru-Zod: The future son of Lyta-Zod and Seg-El and the new ruler of Krypton.
 Hannah Waddingham as Jax-Ur (formerly Sela-Sonn) (main season 2; recurring season 1): ex-leader of the Black Zero terrorist group and Val's former protégée.

Recurring

 Alexis Raben as Rhom (season 1): A rankless Kryptonian, the mother of Ona, and a friend of the House of El.
 Tipper Seifert-Cleveland as Ona (season 1): The daughter of Rhom who is made a disciple of Rao upon being orphaned.
 Andrea Vasiliou as Kol-Da (season 1): A callous member of the Sagitari, and Daron's lover.
 Sarah Armstrong as Kiyo (season 1): A member of Black Zero.
 India Mullen as Sevi (season 1): A member of the Religious Guild who attended to the Voice of Rao.
 Kim Adis as Anda (recurring - season 1; guest - season 2): A member of the Religious Guild who attend to the voice of Rao.
 Sonita Henry as Raika (season 1 and 2): A member of the Cythonnite sect who is saved by Seg, and later assists him.
 Shobu Kapoor as Mama Zed (season 1 and 2): An adoptive mother of Kem.
 Lukas Loughran as Junra (season 1): A member of the Cythonnite sect who is hostile towards outsiders.
 Beatrice Comins as Anireh (season 1): The leader of the Cythonnite sect.
 Faisal Mohammed (uncredited) as Vidar-Zod (season 1 and 2): A brother of Jayna-Zod and the son of Lor-Zod, who was trained to become a powerful warrior, but he died in one mission on Outlands. In the season 2, he is an hallucination to Jayna-Zod.
 Malachi Halett as Young Vidar.
 Nicholas Prasad as Mal (season 1): A Black Zero operative and a right hand to Jax-Ur.
 Emmett J. Scanlan as Lobo (season 2): A bounty hunter and assassin with regenerative powers and enhanced strength who is living on Colu and wants revenge against Brainiac.
 Kae Alexander as Araame (season 2): A former Sagitari instructor and one of Nyssa's former lovers who is a rebel fighter on Wegthor and a right hand to Jax-Ur.
 Ciaran Owens as Preus (season 2): A Sagitari commander on the moon Wegthor.
 Aoibhinn McGinnity as Lis-Ser (season 2): A Kryptonian scientist trying to put Doomsday under Dru-Zod's control.

Guest
 Rupert Graves as Ter-El (season 1): Seg's father.
 Paula Malcomson as Charys-El (season 1): Seg's mother.
 Gordon Alexander as Quex-Ul (season 1): The former commander of Lyta's Sagitari squadron.
 Emmanuel Ighodaro as Lor-Zod (season 1): A Sagitari and father of Jayna-Zod and Vidar-Zod who trained them to become a warriors in the past before passing away.
 Toby Alexander-Smith as Lor-Ran (season 2): A former Rankless and a recruit into Sagitari.
 Staz Nair as Dax-Baron / Doomsday: A Kryptonian who participated in a test which turned him into Doomsday. Doomsday appears in CGI throughout the first and second season while Nair appears in his Kryptonian form during flashbacks in the second season.
 Toni O'Rourke as Wedna-El (season 2): A Kryptonian scientist who was responsible for creating Doomsday.
 Dempsey Bovell as Van-Zod (season 2): A Kryptonian scientist who was also responsible for creating Doomsday.

Episodes

Season 1 (2018)

Season 2 (2019)

Production

Development
In October 2014, David S. Goyer was developing a prequel television series titled Krypton. The series was in development by Syfy network, produced by Goyer and written and executive produced by Ian Goldberg. Damian Kindler was the showrunner with Goyer as co-executive producer. Syfy tweeted a debut of the show in 2018. Hawkwoman was originally announced to appear in the series, but was later decided by the showrunners not to include her in the first season of the series due to her not fitting into the ongoing storylines.

Syfy renewed Krypton for a second season, which premiered on June 12, 2019. Soon after its broadcast, Syfy canceled the series after two seasons in August.

Casting
The casting process began in 2016 and finished in 2018. 

Georgina Campbell was first cast as Lyta Zod. Shaun Sipos was cast as Adam Strange. It was intended by the show's creators to be LGBTQ+ character, but this was only implied following alleged interference from former DC executive Geoff Johns. Cameron Cuffe was cast as Seg-El. Regé-Jean Page auditioned for the role but was not cast because Johns reportedly believed the character had to resemble Superman actor Henry Cavill due to initial fan perception that the show could serve as a possible prequel to the 2013 movie Man of Steel. Alongside Cameron Cuffe, other actors Ian McElhinney, Elliot Cowan, Ann Ogbomo, Rasmus Hardiker, Wallis Day, and Aaron Pierre were cast as Val-El, Daron-Vex, Jayna-Zod, Kem, Nyssa-Vex, and Dev-Em. Blake Ritson was cast as Brainiac.

Paula Malcomson was cast as Charys, while Hannah Waddingham was cast as Jax-Ur. Emmett J. Scanlan was cast as Lobo for the second season.

Filming
In June 2016, production on the pilot was slated to begin later in the year in Montreal. By September, the pilot was filmed in Serbia by Colm McCarthy. The second season began filming in October 2018 in Belfast and wrapped on March 3, 2019.

Release

Broadcast
Kryptons first season premiered on March 21, 2018 and concluded on May 23 with a total of ten episodes. The second season premiered on June 12, 2019.

The first season became available on DC's streaming service DC Universe on April 5, 2019, with the second season airing on August 11, 2020.

Home media
The first season was released on DVD and Blu-Ray on March 5, 2019. The second season was released on DVD and Blu-ray on January 14, 2020.

Other media
In 2018, DC debuted a comic book version of Krypton featuring the show's cast on the cover for Free Comic Book Day. An after show titled Decrypting Krypton premiered on Syfy on March 21, following Krypton premiere episode. Decrypting Krypton featured host Matt Hiscox discussing the latest episode with fans, actors, and producers of Krypton.

Reception

Critical reception
The first season holds a score of 60% on Rotten Tomatoes, based on 42 reviews, with an average rating of 6.26/10. Rotten Tomatoes's critical consensus reads: "Kryptons eccentricity declines into silliness with a dull narrative that fails to fulfill a promising premise". On Metacritic, the series has a weighted average score of 53 out of 100, based on 14 critics, indicating "mixed or average reviews".

A 100% approval rating for the second season was reported by Rotten Tomatoes, with an average rating of 7.96/10 based on 10 reviews. Its critical consensus reads: "Fresh faces, exceptional performances, and a more clearly defined sense of purpose help Krypton find its footing".

Ratings

Season 1

Season 2

Accolades

Cancelled spin-off
In June 2019, Syfy announced a spin-off based on Lobo, set to be produced by Cameron Welsh, who also executive produced Krypton. However, in August, the spin-off was not moving forward alongside Kryptons cancellation after two seasons.

References

External links

Official Warner Bros. Site
Official DC Comics Site

 
2010s American drama television series
2010s American science fiction television series
2018 American television series debuts
2019 American television series endings
American prequel television series
American superhero television series
2010s American time travel television series
English-language television shows
Superman television series
Syfy original programming
Television shows based on DC Comics
Television series about extraterrestrial life
Television series by Warner Horizon Television
Television shows filmed in Montreal
Television series set on fictional planets
Television series created by David S. Goyer
Television shows filmed in Serbia